Patrice Vermette (born 1970) is a Canadian production designer/art director. He is most noted for his work on the films C.R.A.Z.Y., for which he won both the Genie Award for Best Art Direction/Production Design at the 26th Genie Awards and the Jutra Award for Best Art Direction at the 8th Jutra Awards, and Dune, for which he won the Academy Award for Best Production Design at the 94th Academy Awards.

He was also a Jutra winner for Café de Flore at the 14th Jutra Awards and for 1987 at the 17th Jutra Awards, and was nominated at the 13th Jutra Awards for City of Shadows (La Cité) and at the 17th Jutra Awards for Enemy. He was a Genie and Canadian Screen Award nominee at the 30th Genie Awards for 1981, at the 32nd Genie Awards for Café de Flore and at the 2nd Canadian Screen Awards for Enemy, and an Academy Award nominee at the 82nd Academy Awards for The Young Victoria and at the 89th Academy Awards for Arrival.

His other credits include the short film Magical Words (Les Mots magiques).

Filmography

References

External links
 

Canadian art directors
Best Art Direction/Production Design Genie and Canadian Screen Award winners
Living people
Canadian production designers
1970 births
Place of birth missing (living people)
French Quebecers
Best Art Direction Academy Award winners